Little Pilgrim is a novel by the South Korean writer Ko Un. It is based on the character Sudhana from the Avatamsaka Sutra, and the narrative consists of 53 encounters between the boy and various teachers. Ko began to have the chapters published in 1969, and the finished work was first published in book form in 1991. It was published in English in 2005.

Plot
Parallax Press (the publisher) describes the book as:

From Korea’s most revered author comes the tale of a small boy’s quest for enlightenment. Loosely following the last chapter of the Avatamsaka sutra, Little Pilgrim relates the heroic journey of Sudhana, who sets out on a grand adventure. Along the way, he encounters fifty-three teachers — including men, women, children, animals, and heavenly beings — as he travels mountains, valleys, deserts, and forests in his search for truth. A spiritual tale in the tradition of Siddhartha, this novel is now available to English audiences for the first time. A passionate and lively epic, Little Pilgrim takes its readers on a fantastical journey.

Style
Although the subtitle of the book is "A Novel," critics have noted that is slightly inaccurate. Although the work is fiction, it is not a novel in the sense of having narrativity or coherence. Instead it is a presentation of unrelated interesting material which are linked by an "underlying philosophy of interconnectedness."

Reception
The book was reviewed in Publishers Weekly in 2005: "The prose—translated from the Korean by An Sonjae and Young-Moo Kim—varies, with some beautiful descriptions ('The sunlight poured down, turning the innumerable crests of the indigo waves into flashing blades and splintered mirrors') and some improbable ones ('The fleshy bulge on the crown of his head was like nothing so much as an altar-covering'). ... Despite the author's impressive credentials, though, this may be a difficult story for all but the most ardent Buddhist readers."

See also
 South Korean literature

References

1991 novels
Korean-language novels
Literary works by Ko Un
20th-century South Korean novels
South Korean historical novels